Camp Fallujah (formerly known as the MEK (Mujahedin-E Khalq) Compound) is a large compound in Fallujah, Iraq formerly used by the U.S. Marines from 2004 to 2009.

History

Before the Marine occupation, the Iranian dissident group called Mujahideen-e-Khalq used the MEK as a training camp, but turned it over to the U.S. Army 3rd Armored Cavalry Regiment on May 11, 2003 after the Mujahideen-e-Khalq surrender. The 82nd Airborne Division took over the facility in August 2003 and created Forward Operating Base St. Mere. On March 24, 2004, the 1st Marine Expeditionary Force took control from the 82nd Airborne and renamed the FOB, Camp Fallujah in order to better associate the camp with the local Iraqi city. On January 12, 2009, the Government of Iraq took control of the compound from the United States military.

The camp is adjacent to the other major U.S. base in Fallujah, the former Ba'athist resort Camp Baharia (also known as "Dreamland").

U.S. Operational Names
3d Armored Cavalry Regiment - MEK Compound
82nd Airborne - FOB St. Mere
United States Marine Corps - Camp Fallujah

See also
History of the United States Marine Corps
List of United States Marine Corps installations
List of United States Military installations in Iraq

References
Camp Fallujah @ globalsecurity.org
Archived photos from Camp Fallujah

Fallujah
Camp Fallujah
United States Marine Corps in the Iraq War
Installations used by the People's Mojahedin Organization of Iran
2003 establishments in Iraq